Adolphe Gaston Ragueneau (10 October 1881 in Lyon – 14 July 1978 in Draveil) was a French athlete. He competed at the 1900 Summer Olympics in Paris and the 1908 Summer Olympics in London.

In 1900, Ragueneau won a silver medal with the French team in the 5000 metre team race. He finished fourth of the ten men in the race, behind two British runners and teammate Henri Deloge, on the way to a 26–29 loss to the British team.

In the 1908 Olympics, Ragueneau competed in the 1500 metres but did not finish his initial semifinal heat and did not advance to the final.

References

External links 

 
 

1881 births
1978 deaths
Athletes from Lyon
Olympic athletes of France
Athletes (track and field) at the 1900 Summer Olympics
Athletes (track and field) at the 1908 Summer Olympics
Olympic silver medalists for France
French male middle-distance runners
Medalists at the 1900 Summer Olympics
Olympic silver medalists in athletics (track and field)
19th-century French people
20th-century French people